Claudio Morra (born 22 January 1995) is an Italian professional footballer who plays as a striker for  club Piacenza.

Club career

Early career
Born in Savigliano, Morra began his career with amateur club Saluzzo, where he remained until he was 16 years old. In 2011, he moved to Spanish club Levante, where he remained for one season, then back to Italy, with Verona, and then Torino in January 2013. He was one of the four overage players of Torino's Primavera in the 2014–15 season, scoring a hat-trick against Fiorentina in the semifinals of the Campionato Nazionale Primavera. 

On 4 August Morra was signed by Lega Pro newcomer Andria, and in January 2016, Savona.

Pro Vercelli
In July 2016, he was sold to Pro Vercelli. Under his former Torino youth coach, Moreno Longo, he made 27 appearances and scored three goals in the 2016–17 season.

Virtus Entella
On 25 July 2019, he joined Virtus Entella. On 28 January 2021, he moved to Pordenone on loan.

Piacenza
On 19 August 2022, Morra signed a contract with Piacenza for a term of one year, with an option to extend for two more years.

International career
On 11 November 2015 he received his first Italy U20 team call-up, replacing Alessandro Piu who joined the U21 team.

Honours

Club
Torino
Campionato Primavera: 2014–15

References

External links
 

1995 births
Living people
People from Savigliano
Sportspeople from the Province of Cuneo
Footballers from Piedmont
Italian footballers
Association football forwards
Serie A players
Serie B players
Serie C players
Torino F.C. players
S.S. Fidelis Andria 1928 players
Savona F.B.C. players
F.C. Pro Vercelli 1892 players
Virtus Entella players
Pordenone Calcio players
Piacenza Calcio 1919 players
Italy youth international footballers